Wellington da Silva Pinto (born 30 September 1991 in Bauru), simply known as Wellington, is a Brazilian footballer who plays for Náutico as a central defender.

Career
He was promoted to the main cast from Palmeiras, after good performances in the Copa São Paulo.

Honours
CSA
Campeonato Alagoano: 2021

References

External links

1991 births
Living people
People from Bauru
Brazilian footballers
Association football defenders
Campeonato Brasileiro Série A players
Campeonato Brasileiro Série B players
Sociedade Esportiva Palmeiras players
Clube Atlético Sorocaba players
Agremiação Sportiva Arapiraquense players
Club Athletico Paranaense players
Associação Atlética Ponte Preta players
Santa Cruz Futebol Clube players
Centro Sportivo Alagoano players
Footballers from São Paulo (state)